The 1991-92 Australian Baseball League Championship was taken out by the Daikyo Dolphins who defeated Perth Heat 3 game to 1 in the 4 game Championship Series.

Ladder

Championship series

Final Series: Game 1: 1st Vs 2nd at Parry Field

Final Series: Game 2: 1st Vs 2nd at Parry Field

Final Series: Game 3: 1st Vs 2nd at Palm Meadows

Final Series: Game 4: 1st Vs 2nd at Palm Meadows

Awards

Top Stats

All-Star Team

References

Australian Baseball League (1989–1999) seasons
1991 in Australian baseball
1992 in Australian baseball